"Stand" is a song by American band Poison, written by Richie Kotzen prior to joining the band. It was the first single from their 1993 album Native Tongue. The song reached number 15 on the US Billboard Album Rock Tracks chart, number 35 on the Billboard Top 40 Mainstream chart, and number 50 on the Billboard Hot 100. The song also charted at number 25 on the UK Singles Chart and number 15 in Canada.

Background
The album version of "Stand" includes the Los Angeles First A.M.E. Church choir on backing vocals. The single's B-side, "Whip Comes Down", has not been included on any Poison album to date. An acoustic version of the song appears as a bonus track on the Japanese release of Richie Kotzen's Acoustic Cuts. It features the original lyrics, which include an additional verse.

Charts

Release history

References

Poison (American band) songs
1992 songs
1993 singles
Capitol Records singles
Song recordings produced by Richie Zito
Songs written by Bobby Dall
Songs written by Bret Michaels
Songs written by Richie Kotzen
Songs written by Rikki Rockett